Nepali calendar can refer to:
 Vikram Samvat, the official calendar in Nepal
 Nepal Sambat, the ceremonial calendar in Nepal